The 2013 Copa Libertadores de América Finals were the final two-legged tie that decided the winner of the 2013 Copa Libertadores de América, the 54th edition of the Copa Libertadores de América, South America's premier international club football tournament organized by CONMEBOL.

The finals were contested in two-legged home-and-away format between Paraguayan team Olimpia and Brazilian team Atlético Mineiro. The first leg was hosted by Olimpia at Estadio Defensores del Chaco in Asunción on 17 July 2013, while the second leg was hosted by Atlético Mineiro at Estádio Governador Magalhães Pinto (Mineirão) in Belo Horizonte on 24 July. The winner earned the right to represent CONMEBOL at the 2013 FIFA Club World Cup, entering at the semifinal stage, and the right to play against the 2013 Copa Sudamericana winners in the 2014 Recopa Sudamericana.

Olimpia won the first leg 2–0, and Atlético Mineiro won the second leg by the same score after extra time, which meant the title was decided by a penalty shoot-out, which Atlético Mineiro won 4–3 to claim their first Copa Libertadores title.

Qualified teams

Atlético Mineiro came into the finals as a first-time finalist, while Olimpia were three-time champion and three-time runner-up, and the first and only club to be a finalist in each decade of the tournament's existence.

Road to the finals

Note: In all scores below, the score of the home team is given first.

Format
The finals were played on a home-and-away two-legged basis, with the higher-seeded team hosting the second leg. However, CONMEBOL required that the second leg of the finals must be played in South America, i.e., a finalist from Mexico must host the first leg regardless of seeding. If tied on aggregate, the away goals rule was not used, and 30 minutes of extra time was played. If still tied after extra time, the penalty shoot-out was used to determine the winner.

Match details

First leg
Alejandro Silva opened the scoring in the 23rd minute when he picked up a pass near the right wing and set off on a run towards goal before hitting a low left-footed strike from just outside the box giving the goalkeeper no chance.
Wilson Pittoni got the second goal in the fourth minute of stoppage time when he curled a right footed free-kick past the goalkeeper who was hampered by his own defender in his way on the line.

|valign="top"|
|style="vertical-align:top; width:50%"|

Second leg
Jô opened the scoring in the 46th minute when he took struck the ball on the turn past goalkeeper Martín Silva.
In the 85th minute Atlético Mineiro got their second when Leonardo Silva headed Bernard's cross into the top corner of the net. There were no goals in extra time, and in the penalty shoot-out Olimpia's Herminio Miranda missed the first kick, and Matías Giménez shot against the bar in the fifth kick, to hand Atlético Mineiro the title to for the first time and a berth in the 2013 FIFA Club World Cup.

|valign="top"|
|style="vertical-align:top; width:50%"|

See also
2013 Copa Libertadores Femenina Final
2013 Copa Sudamericana Finals

References

External links
 
Copa Libertadores, CONMEBOL.com 

Finals
Copa Libertadores Finals
Libertadores Finals 2013
Libertadores Finals 2013
2013 in Brazilian football
Copa Libertadores Finals 2013